Neal Communities is a privately held land development and home building company based in Lakewood Ranch, Florida, and founded in 1970.

History 
Founded in 1970, Neal Communities’ first residence was a 960-square-foot unit in the Whitney Beach condominium complex on northern Longboat Key, which sold for around $23,900. 
 

2010 saw Neal Communities expand into Venice with its latest community, Grand Palm.

Neal Communities started development for communities in the Fort Myers/Naples area in 2013.

Special COVID-19 vaccination access 
In early 2021 multiple communities built by Neal Communities were selected as the location of special pop-up vaccination clinics. Residents of nearby communities say they were not invited to these special clinics despite only living a few minutes from the communities where the pop-up clinic was being held. A spokesperson for Neal Communities stated "the company was not involved in the Lakewood Ranch vaccination site and said the company would have no further comment." Residents in the Neal Communities' Grand Palm subdivision which is in southern Sarasota County received invitations to Kings Gate (located in Charlotte County), which is a gated neighborhood where Neal Communities was also building homes. Boca Royale was a location of one of these pop-up vaccination sites. In addition to members of the community receiving an invitation to the pop-up vaccination site, emails show member of the country club associated with the community also received invitations to the clinic.

Awards 
In 2012, Neal Communities was recognized as one of “America’s Best Builders” by Builder Magazine.

The company was named “Builder of The Year” by Professional Builder Magazine in 2015.

From 2013 to 2019, Neal Communities was awarded Green Builder of The Year by the FGBC (Florida Green Building Coalition) for its commitment to building homes to green standards and certifying the most homes in Florida.

References 

Companies based in Manatee County, Florida
Real estate companies established in 1970
1970 establishments in Florida
Home builders
Construction and civil engineering companies established in 1970